Santosh Dutta (Bengali: সন্তোষ দত্ত; 2 December 1925 – 5 March 1988) was a Bengali actor, best known for playing the character of Jatayu in Satyajit Ray's Feluda movie series Sonar Kella and Joi Baba Felunath.

Early life
Dutta was a lawyer by profession. Essentially a comedian, he elevated comedy acting to the levels of character roles. Satyajit Ray gave him the first break with a small role in his immortal film Parash Pathar. After Sonar Kella, he became so associated with the role of "Jatayu" that Satyajit Ray later reframed the appearance of Jatayu and started making the sketches of Jatayu resembling Dutta in Feluda novels. After the death of this actor, Ray once remarked that there will be no further movies in the Feluda series as Jatayu cannot be thought of without Santosh Dutta. Though after the death of Ray, the role of Jatayu was later played by artistes, such as Anup Kumar, Bibhu Bhattacharya, and even Rabi Ghosh. these actors agreed that it was impossible to play the character without the influence of Santosh Dutta in mind.

Career
Apart from playing Jatayu, Dutta played crucial roles in Satyajit Ray's masterpieces for children like Goopy Gyne Bagha Byne and Hirak Rajar Deshe. In Goopy Gayen Bagha Bayen, Dutta played dual roles of the kings of "Halla" and "Shundi". In Hirak Rajar Deshe, which is a sequel to Goopy Gayen Bagha Bayen, Dutta played the role of a mysterious scientist (known as Gobeshok Gobuchondro Gyanotirtho Gyanorotno Gyanambudhi Gyanochuramoni), in addition to a small appearance for the same 'King of Shundi'.

Another milestone in Dutta's career was playing Gopal Bhar in the movie of same name, Gopal Bhar being a humorous character known for centuries in India, particularly the state of West Bengal.

The role of Abalakanto in Ogo Bodhu Sundari has also become legendary.

Dutta played important roles in films like Teen Kanya, Paras Pathar, Kapurush O Mahapurush, Streer Patra, Marjina Abdallah, Jana Aranya, Char Murti and Gana Devata. He played the roles of comedians in some commercial theaters. Kone Bibhrat was one of the plays in his later years which was a mega hit. He worked in a TV serial called Goenda Bhagabandas with Rabi Ghosh, another famous actor of his time.

Filmography

References

External links

Bengali male actors
Bengali Hindus
Male actors in Bengali cinema
1988 deaths
University of Calcutta alumni
1925 births
Indian male film actors
20th-century Indian male actors
Male actors from Kolkata
People from Dhaka